Muddy Creek is a tributary of the Susquehanna River in York County, Pennsylvania, in the United States.

It is crossed by the Muddy Creek Bridge, Maryland and Pennsylvania Railroad in Lower Chanceford Township and Peach Bottom Township, Pennsylvania.

See also
List of rivers of Pennsylvania

References

External links
U.S. Geological Survey: PA stream gaging stations

Rivers of Pennsylvania
Tributaries of the Susquehanna River
Rivers of York County, Pennsylvania